Kevin Hufnagel is an American musician, based in NYC. He is known for his solo guitar works, for fronting the progressive instrumental rock/metal band Dysrhythmia, and for being a member of Gorguts, Vaura, Sabbath Assembly, Veldune, and Byla. He also is a full time guitar instructor, teaching both in-person and virtually.

Performance discography

Byla
2005: Byla (Translation Loss Records)
2007: Byla + Jarboe  - Viscera (Translation Loss Records)
2009 : Francesco Brunotti/Various Artists - Nocturne (Persistencebit Records) (contributes the track "Bloodrush")

Dysrhythmia
2000: Contradiction (self-released)
2001: No Interference (self-released)
2001: split 10-inch w/ xthoughtstreamsx (Rice Control Records)
2002: split 7-inch w/ Technician (Tranquility Base Records)
2003: Pretest (Relapse Records)
2004: Live from the Relapse Contamination Festival (Relapse Records)
2005: No Interference - reissue with bonus tracks (Translation Loss Records)
2006: Barriers and Passages (Relapse Records)
2007: Fractures - split CD w/ Rothko (Acerbic Noise Development Records)
2009: Psychic Maps (Relapse Records)
2012: Test of Submission (Profound Lore Records)
2016: The Veil of Control (Profound Lore Records)
2019: Terminal Threshold (Translation Loss Records)

Gorguts
2013:  Colored Sands (Season of Mist)
2016:  Pleiades' Dust (Season of Mist)

Grey Division Blue
1994:  Departure (self-released)

Kevin Hufnagel
1997: While I Wait (self-released)
2009: Songs for the Disappeared (Nightfloat Recordings)
2011: Transparencies (Nightfloat Recordings)
2012: Polar Night (Nightfloat Recordings-digital)
2013: From the 23rd Floor (Abandoned 4-track demos 1996 - 1998 + Live in Baltimore 2008) (Nightfloat Recordings-digital)
2013: Ashland (Nightfloat Recordings-digital/Coup sur Coup-cassette)
2014: The Murderer's Tracks/The Weather Was Wrong (Nightfloat Recordings-digital)
2015: Kleines Biest (Nightfloat Recordings-digital/Handmade Birds-cassette)
2015: V/A - And Suddenly Everything, Absolutely Everything, Was There (bandcamp) (contributes the track "Hallucination II")
2016: Backwards Through the Maze (Nightfloat Recordings-digital/Nostalgium Directive-cassette)
2017: The Protected Shards (Nightfloat Recordings-digital)
2017: Halloween EP 2017 (bandcamp)
2017: V/A - Coup Sûr: An Introduction To Coup Sur Coup Records (Coup Sur Coup Records) (contributes the tracks "Ancestral Instinct" and "Ashland")
2018: Messages to the Past (Nightfloat Recordings-digital/Translation Loss Records-LP)
2018: Halloween EP 2018 (bandcamp)
2018: V/A - Feedback Through A Magnifying Glass Volume I (Coup Sur Coup Records) (contributes the track "Final Dawn")
2022: Polar Night II (Nightfloat Recordings-digital)

Invisible Traces
2020: Invisible Traces (Nightfloat Recordings-digital)

Sabbath Assembly
2012: Ye Are Gods (Anja Offensive/Svart) (guitar on "We Come From The One")
2013: The Four Horsemen 7-inch (Svart)
2014: Quaternity (Svart)
2014: Eno Ot Derotser cassette (Svart)
2015: Sabbath Assembly (Svart)
2017: Rites of Passage (Svart)
2017: Various Artists - Communion of Saints (Brave Mysteries) (contributes the track "And It Was Dead, Having No Motion (St Peter)")
2018: Exsanguinata (original soundtrack) (bandcamp)
2019: A Letter of Red (Svart)

Vaura
2012: Selenelion (Wierd Records)
2013: The Missing (Profound Lore Records)
2019: Sables (Profound Lore Records)
2022: Vista of Deviant Anatomies (Primal Architecture Records)

Veldune
2022: Veldune (Nightfloat Recordings)

Guest appearances

Aseitas
2018: Aseitas (bandcamp) (guitar solo on "City of Stone")

The Brazilian Gentleman
2019: s/t (Lazy Thinking) (baritone ukulele on "Sweep Back Those Leaves (C.A. Mix)")
2020: 808 Hymns (Internet and Weed)

Costanza
2008: Sonic Diary (Zerokilled Music) (guitar on "I Am Ready")

Didkovsky / Hufnagel / Ulrich / Smith
2015: Petromyzontiformes Vol 1 (bandcamp) (guitar on "III, for Electric Guitars")

Doctor Nerve
2020: Loud (Punos Music) (guitar solo on "Meta 04 (bonus CD only)")

Empty Flowers
2014: The Air You Found (Translation Loss) (remix/guitar on "Call A Priest")

Fear Falls Burning
2007: Once We All Walk Through Solid Objects (Tonefloat) (guitar on "Fear Falls Burning vs Byla")

Feast of the Epiphany
2023: Significance (Strategy of Tension) (guitar on "Love Dream")

Hathenter
2017: Hathenter Ouija (Hathenter)

H O N E Y B L O O M
2020: Blooming (Troll Sounds) (guitar solo on "Selfless Warrior")

Horror God
2019: Cursed Seeds (Lavadome Productions) (guitar solo on "They Were Behind Barbed Wire")

Howling Sycamore
2018: Howling Sycamore (Prosthetic Records) (guitar solos on "Upended" and "Midway")
2019: Seven Pathways to Annihilation (Prosthetic Records) (guitar solos on "Mastering Fire" and "Initiation")

Jarboe
2008: Mahakali (The End Records)
2018: The Cut of the Warrior (Translation Loss Records) (guitar on "Karuna" (Byla mix))

The Mirror and The Shadow
2017: Various Artists - Communion of Saints (Brave Mysteries) (contributes the track "Vox Sanguinis (St Ursula)")

Moral Collapse
2021: s/t (Subcontinental Records) (guitar solo on "Suspension of Belief")

Sanity Obscure
2012: Subterranean Constellation (self-released) (guitar solo on "Doublethink")

Sculptured
2021: The Liminal Phase (BMG Records) (trade-off guitar solos on "State of Exception")

Svengahli
2020: Nightmares of Our Own Design (self-released) (guitars on "Nightmares of Our Own Design II (Adrift)")

Theta International
2020: Continual Activation Theory (bandcamp) (guitar solo and additional rhythm guitar on "Sons of Hydra")

Wake
2022: Thought Form Decent (Metal Blade Records) (guitar solo on "Observer to Master", additional guitar on "Pareidolia")

Warforged
2019: I: Voice (The Artisan Era) (guitar solo on "Eat Them While They Sleep")

Yellow6
2010: Close/r (Editions6)

Soundtracks
2019: Kevin Hufnagel & Natasha Kermani Imitation Girl - Original Motion Picture Soundtrack (Burning Witches Records)

References

External links 
 
 Kevin Hufnagel Interview for La Hoja de Arena (in Spanish)

Living people
Year of birth missing (living people)
Place of birth missing (living people)
American heavy metal guitarists
Gorguts members
Coup Sur Coup Records artists